USS Bridget (DE-1024) was a  in the United States Navy. She was named for Francis Joseph Bridget, a naval aviator who served on the Commander's Staff of Patrol Wing 10 during the Japanese attack on the Philippines on 8 December 1941. He was taken prisoner with the American forces on Bataan and was killed 15 December 1944 when a Japanese prison ship in which he was embarked was sunk off Olongapo, Luzon, Philippine Islands.

References

External links 
navsource.org: USS Bridget
  hazegray.org: USS Bridget
USS Bridget Website

Dealey-class destroyer escorts
Ships built by Lockheed Shipbuilding and Construction Company
1956 ships